Guilty was a television programme which aired on Sky One from 1997 to 1999, produced by Anglia Television and presented by Carole Malone.

The show was a lighthearted comedy programme based in a mock courtroom. Participants would bring on friends or family they had problems with and would later be found guilty or not guilty by the audience.

External links

1997 British television series debuts
1999 British television series endings
1990s British comedy television series
Sky UK original programming
Television series by ITV Studios
Television shows produced by Anglia Television
English-language television shows